P. Dickson Wamwiri Wanjiku (24 December 1984 – 6 September 2020) was a Kenyan taekwondo practitioner. Wamwiri qualified for the men's 58 kg class at the 2008 Summer Olympics in Beijing, after winning the championship title from the African Qualification Tournament in Tripoli, Libya. He lost his preliminary match to defending world and Olympic champion Chu Mu-yen of Chinese Taipei, with a final score of 0–7.

References

External links

NBC Olympics Profile

1984 births
2020 deaths
Kenyan male taekwondo practitioners
Place of death missing
Place of birth missing
Olympic taekwondo practitioners of Kenya
Taekwondo practitioners at the 2008 Summer Olympics